Mesnay is a commune in the Jura department in Bourgogne-Franche-Comté in eastern France.

Population

Location 

Mesnay is located in the Reculée des Planches gorge, 1.8 km from Arbois, 3.4 km from Les Planches-près-Arbois

Economy 
Five winemakers currently have their cellars in Mesnay, whose south-facing slopes, known as the Côteau des Nouvelles, are covered in vines:

 Domaine Martin Faudot (Michel Faudot)
 Domaine de la Cibellyne (Benoît Royer)
 Domaine Hughes Béguet (Patrice Béguet)
 Domaine des Bélemnites (Christian Melet)
 Thomas Popy

There is also a vine nursery in Mesnay, run by Ahmed Lahlouh.

One dairy farm remains in the village, run by Samuel Étievant, who has recently had his production certified as organic, and delivers his milk to the Fruitière du Plateau Arboisien. The family also runs a small campsite and bed-and-breakfast on the farm.

Other cottages in the village are also available for holiday rentals.

In the mornings a small general store sells fresh bread and patisseries.

A bar, Le Nouvel Atelier, opened in the village in 2017,

A wholesale jam producer, Patrick Le Gall, set up his business in Mesnay in 2015, La Francomtoise de confiturerie.

Other local businesses include building, roadworks and electrical companies.

Since 2011 the premises of the former village school have been occupied by a Montessori nursery and primary school, Graine de Vie.

Places to Visit 

The Cartonnerie de Mesnay, Écomusée du carton et maison de l'abeille. Originally a cardboard factory, Hétier Père et Fils, founded in 1710 on the banks of the Cuisance river, this disaffected industrial site has since been cleaned up and transformed into a cultural site. The former cardboard works can be visited in the Écomusée du carton, whilst a small, neighbouring museum, the Maison de l'abeille, provides an interesting introduction to apiculture, which still thrives in the village. The site is now also home to a number of associations, artists and craftspeople, including sculptors, a puppet-theatre company and a business producing high-end tree houses.

Every Tuesday evening throughout July and August the village organises a very popular outdoor food market.

See also
Communes of the Jura department

References

External links
https://ecomusee-carton.org/

Communes of Jura (department)